Rictaxis is a genus of minute sea snails or "bubble snails", marine gastropod mollusks or micromollusks in the family Acteonidae, the "barrel bubble" snails.

The genus name is derived from Latin words, meaning “open mouth”, and “axis” referring to the columella.

Species 
Species within the genus Rictaxis include:
 Rictaxis albus (Sowerby, 1873)
 Rictaxis painei (Dall, 1903)
 Rictaxis punctocaelatus (Carpenter, 1864)
 Rictaxis sanguinea Valdès, 2008
 Species that have been synonymized
 Rictaxis punctostriatus : synonym of Japonactaeon punctostriatus (C. B. Adams, 1840)

 Rictaxis albus Sowerby, 1873
 Distribution : South Africa
 Length : 10–21 mm
 Description white shell with numerous spiraling white to lightbrown grooves
 Rictaxis painei Dall, 1903
 Distribution : America
 Rictaxis punctocaelatus Carpenter, 1864 Barrel shell; Carpenter's baby bubble (synonym: Acteon punctocaelatus Carpenter, 1864)
 Distribution : Southern Alaska, British Columbia, California
 Length : 10–20 mm
 Description : found in sand from lowtide line to depths up to 50 m; evenly elliptical shell with alternating darker brown and grayish-brown bands; outer lip and columellar folds are whitish; large spire; ovate columella strongly twisted, with a pointed posterior notch and a rounded base.

References

External links

Acteonidae